Zasyadko is a small lunar impact crater located to the northeast of Mare Smythii. It lies beyond the eastern lunar limb in an area that is only visible during favorable librations. It is located entirely within the crater Babcock. To the southwest is McAdie. Zasyadko is a bowl-shaped formation with a relatively small interior floor. It is not significantly eroded along the rim.

References

Links
 
 

Impact craters on the Moon